Gianfranco Marzolla (born 9 January 1937, in Donada) was an Italian gymnast.

He won the bronze medal in all-around with the Italy national team at the 1960 Summer Olympics.

References

External links
 

1937 births
Italian male artistic gymnasts
Gymnasts at the 1960 Summer Olympics
Olympic gymnasts of Italy
Olympic bronze medalists for Italy
Olympic medalists in gymnastics
Living people
Medalists at the 1960 Summer Olympics